The Lancia Augusta is a small passenger car produced by Italian car manufacturer Lancia between 1933 and 1936. It made its première at the 1932 Paris Motor Show. The car was powered by a 1,196 cc Lancia V4 engine.

During the 1920s, Lancia had been known as producers of sports cars and middle sized sedans: the smaller Augusta represented a departure from that tradition, and contributed to a significant growth in Lancia's unit sales during the 1930s. Nevertheless, in terms of volumes sold, the Augusta was overwhelmed by Fiat's much more aggressively priced 508 Ballila.

Lancia Belna
Lancia started its French operations on 1 October 1931. At its first factory outside of Italy, at Bonneuil-sur-Marne, Lancia built the Augusta and later Aprilia models, although named them Belna and Ardennes. Approximately  3,000 Augusta/Belna and 1,500 Aprilia/Ardennes were built.

Of the approximately 3,000 Belnas built between 1934 and 1938, 2,500 were saloons and 500 bare chassis.

Georges Paulin had invented the retractable hardtop and had shown his designs to French coachbuilder Marcel Pourtout. Carrosserie Pourtout built several bodies based on the French-built Lancia Belna.

References

Bibliography

External links

 Lancisti.net — Community for Lancia owners and enthusiasts
 Article on the 75th anniversary of the Augusta/Belna, with period and contemporary images of the French factory

Augusta
1930s cars
Cars introduced in 1932